He Can't Stop Doing It (German: Er kann's nicht lassen) is a 1962 West German mystery film directed by Axel von Ambesser and starring Heinz Rühmann, Rudolf Forster and Grit Boettcher.  It was loosely based on the Father Brown stories by G. K. Chesterton, Rühmann reprising his role from the 1960 film The Black Sheep. It is part in the post-war tradition of German krimi films, similar to the ongoing series of Edgar Wallace adaptations.

The film's sets were designed by the art directors Rolf Zehetbauer and Herbert Strabel. It was shot at the Bavaria Studios in Munich and on location at Anif Palace near Salzburg, doubling for Darroway Castle in the film. Other filming took place in Ireland itself.

Cast
 Heinz Rühmann as Pater Brown
 Peter Parten as Bruce Payne
 Grit Boettcher as Berenice
 Ruth-Maria Kubitschek as Mrs. Holland
 Siegfried Wischnewski as 	Inspektor O'Connally
 Lina Carstens as Mrs. Smith
 Horst Tappert as Simpson
 Peter Ehrlich as O'Leary
 Rainer Penkert as Lord Gilbert Darroway
 Emmerich Schrenk as Joshua
 Otto Schmöle as Lord Bannister
 E.O. Fuhrmann as Malone
 Uli Steigberg as Oliver Lynn
 Hans-Dieter Jendreyko as Sam
 Paul Glawion as Kellner
 Rosl Mayr as Kundin
 Rudolf Forster as Bischof

References

Bibliography
 Goble, Alan. The Complete Index to Literary Sources in Film. Walter de Gruyter, 1999.

External links

1962 films
1960s mystery films
Adaptations of works by G. K. Chesterton
Films about Catholic priests
Films based on short fiction
Films directed by Axel von Ambesser
Films set in Ireland
1960s German-language films
German mystery films
German sequel films
West German films
Bavaria Film films
Films shot at Bavaria Studios
1960s German films